Malosharipovo (Bäläkäy Şärip) is a rural locality (a village) in Araslanovsky Selsoviet, Meleuzovsky District, Bashkortostan, Russia. The population was 237 as of 2010. There are two streets.

Geography 
Malosharipovo is located 21 km northeast of Meleuz (the district's administrative centre) by road. Krasny Yar is the nearest rural locality.

References 

Rural localities in Meleuzovsky District